Methylobacterium haplocladii  is a Gram-negative and non-spore-forming bacteria from the genus of Methylobacterium which has been isolated from the moss Haplocladium microphyllum in Japan.

References

Further reading

External links
Type strain of Methylobacterium haplocladii at BacDive -  the Bacterial Diversity Metadatabase

Hyphomicrobiales
Bacteria described in 2013